General elections were held in the Cayman Islands in November 1988. The result was a victory for the Progress with Dignity Team led by Norman Bodden, which won seven of the twelve elected seats.

Results

References

Elections in the Cayman Islands
Cayman
1988 in the Cayman Islands
1988 elections in British Overseas Territories
November 1988 events in North America
Election and referendum articles with incomplete results